Kuşaklı (also known as Šarišša, Kuşaklı-Sarissa) is an archaeological site in Turkey. During the ancient Hittite period, it was known as Sarissa. It is located 4 km (2½ miles) west of Başören village of Altınyayla district in Sivas Province, 60 km (37⅓ miles) south of Sivas city. Excavation continues under the direction of Andreas Müller-Karpe.
Excavations began in 1992. Dirk Mielke identified from the 16th to 13th centuries BC three "pottery horizons" and two Hittite building layers of different character. Mielke further identified a third, Iron Age building layer.

Sarissa 
In the second excavation campaign, the archaeologists discovered written records of its Hittite period; the fourth, smallest, and so far last major archive in the Hittite language.  In 1997 Gernot Wilhelm reported: 
The large majority of the 45 tablet fragments published were found in the southern room of building A in the Western part of the Acropolis. Both the small finds in the room and the contents of the tablets suggest that the room had a connection with ritual practices. The finds belong to layer 2 (period of the Empire) which perished in a conflagration (2nd half of 13th century BC). It is due to the effects of this fire that the tablets, originally stored in an unbaked condition, survived. The contents of the tablets, written by several hands, refer to the ritual practice, namely cult and prophecy. Most numerous are "oracle protocols" for lot and bird oracles, rarer are "cult inventories" dealing with ritual festivals, idols and cultic supply. Two tablets represent the category of "festival rituals" and describe the celebration of the spring festival by the king in Šarišša (Šarešša).

Sarissa was founded in the 16th century BC as a midsized provincial town, close to Kussara. The scribes in Hattusa catalogued Sarissa in the "Upper Land" of Hatti.

"There were gates at the four corners of the city... one city gate is of Syrian-Levantine form." In 2004, the team uncovered a pool or dam by the northwest gate - the oldest known dam in Anatolia. The gate contains wood, and dendrochronology has claimed that the wood was cut 1530 BC; but this finding has not been peer reviewed.

The Buildings 
Two Hittite town consisted of an upper and lower city. The upper city had a town wall with towers and several gates. Only small parts of the living quarters were excavated. The houses had irregular plans and were separated by small streets. Two larger houses were excavated in the middle of the town, not far away from the main temple. Typical for these houses is a central hall with many smaller rooms around it. In one of the houses (house A) were found 45 cuneiform clay tablets with ritual texts. It seems possible that house A was the house of a priest.
The main deity of Sarissa was the Weather-God; he is named in the treaty between Hattusili III and Rameses II. The temple of the god is the largest Hittite temple so far excavated. It is built of stones with a huge courtyard in the middle, about 76 by 74 m large. a second temple was in the north of the city. It has again a larger courtyard and is about 54 by 36 m big. It was perhaps the temple of the goddess Anzili, who is mentioned in the texts of the town. Within this temple were also found seal impressions of a so far unknown king.
About 5 km south of the town was lake. Next to it were found the building of a temple. In Hettite texts is mentioned that the king came to the town and went directly to the Huwasistone of the Weather god. The excavators wonder whether this temple and lake are actually the place of the Huwasistone, where certain rituals were performed.

Special finds 
A remarkable find are fragments of a Mycenaean pottery vessel found in one room of the north-western city gate. Mycenaean vessels are otherwise extremely rare in Hittite context, while they are very common at other places in the Mediterranean. On seal impressions was found a so far unknown king called Mizima. He might be a local governor, claiming the king's title.

Later history 

Sarissa was sacked during the general turmoil following the reign of Arnuwanda I in the early 14th century. It was then rebuilt under the Hittite revival from Samuha under Tudhaliya III.

Sarissa was sacked again with the other Hittite cities in 1200 BC. Its site was reoccupied and repaired, but then abandoned. In the Iron Age, around 600 BC there was small village on the side and shortly later a round fortress was erected here. In early Roman times a single tumulus tomb was built at the highest point. The stone built chamber was found looted but contained the remains of 6 skeletons.

Dark Age Kuşaklı 
Sarissa was resettled during the 7th/6th century BC, but its name then is unknown.

See also
Cities of the ancient Near East
Short chronology timeline

References

External links 

Kuşaklı-Sarissa

Hittite sites in Turkey
Archaeological sites in Central Anatolia
Sivas Province